Pielenhofen Abbey is a former Cistercian nunnery (founded in 1240), in Pielenhofen in the valley of the Naab, Bavaria, Germany. It was occupied until 2010 by the Visitandines, also known as the Salesian Sisters. The Diocese of Regensburg maintains a school here.

History 
The abbey at Pielenhofen for Cistercian nuns, dedicated to the Assumption of the Blessed Virgin Mary, was founded in 1240 by the lords of Hohenfels and Ehrenfels. In 1542, during the Reformation in Pfalz-Neuburg, it was placed under secular administration. In 1655 it was subordinated to Kaisheim Abbey as a sub-priory.

During the secularisation of Bavaria in 1803 the priory was dissolved; the nuns' church became a parish church. In 1806 Carmelite nuns from Munich and Neuburg an der Donau moved into the premises as a joint nunnery. In 1838 the Visitandines,  also known as Salesian Sisters, bought it, and established a girls' school here. In 1981 the Pielenhofen Primary School, a boarding school of the Regensburg Cathedral Choir, replaced the earlier school. In 2010 the five remaining nuns moved to the community of the Visitandines at Zangberg.

Abbey church 

The Baroque church has two towers of three storeys, two aisles and a transept, under a cupola in the centre. The church contains a late Baroque high altar with eight columns. The ceiling with a depiction of the Holy Trinity is by Jacob Carl Stauder. The pictures of the twelve apostles are by Johann Gebhard of Prüfening Abbey.

Notes and references

Sources and external links 
 Klöster in Bayern: Pielenhofen - Zisterze im Naabtal 
 Schwestern der Heimsuchung Mariens Deutsche Föderation: Pielenhofen 

Cistercian nunneries in Germany
Monasteries in Bavaria
1240s establishments in the Holy Roman Empire
1240 establishments in Europe
Buildings and structures in Regensburg (district)